Sophia Albertine, Countess of Erbach-Erbach (30 July 1683, in Erbach – 4 September 1742, in Eisfeld), was Countess of Erbach-Erbach by birth and by marriage Duchess of Saxe-Hildburghausen. From 1724 to 1728, she was Regent of Saxe-Hildburghausen.

Life 
Sophia Albertine was the youngest daughter of General Count George Louis I of Erbach-Erbach (1643–1693) and his wife Countess Amalia Katharina of Waldeck-Eisenberg (1640–1697). She married on 4 February 1704 in Erbach Duke Ernest Frederick I of Saxe-Hildburghausen. Sophia Albertine was responsible for the education of their children because her husband was largely devoted to the life of a soldier outside the country.

After her husband's death in 1724 Sophia Albertine acted as regent for her minor son, Ernest Frederick II of Saxe-Hildburghausen. She managed to reduce the national debt by savings and cuttings.  A large part of the court was dismissed and the costly Guard was dissolved. She reduced the number of taxes from 16 to 8.  In an attempt to obtain cash, she sold off the valuable ducal library.

Her husband had sold the District of Schalkau to the Duchy of Saxe-Meiningen in 1723, in order to raise money. She regarded this sale as illegal. Influenced by Prince Joseph of Saxe-Hildburghausen, who was in Hildeburghausen at the time, Sophia Albertine declared war on Saxe-Meiningen and had Schalkau occupied militarily on 11 July 1724.

After a fire in the town of Hildeburghausen in 1725, she played a major role in support of those affected. The main hall in the Hildburghausen Palace was equipped with an inlaid floor with a design in a star shape, in the center of which were the Duchess's initials "SA".

After her son took over government in 1728, she retired to her Wittum seat of Eisfeld, where she died on 4 September 1742.

Offspring 
Sophia Albertine and her husband Ernest Frederick had 14 children, as listed below, but as many as 11 of their children died in infancy, and only three children reached adulthood. Their children were:
 Ernest Louis Hollandinus (b. Hildburghausen, 24 November 1704 – d. Hildburghausen, 26 November 1704).
 Sophie Amalie Elisabeth (b. Hildburghausen, 5 October 1705 – d. Hildburghausen, 28 February 1708).
 Ernest Louis (b. Hildburghausen, 6 February 1707 – d. Hildburghausen, 17 April 1707).
 Ernest Frederick II, Duke of Saxe-Hildburghausen (b. Hildburghausen, 17 December 1707 – d. Hildburghausen, 13 August 1745).
 Frederick August (b. Hildburghausen, 8 May 1709 – d. Hildburghausen, 4 March 1710).
 Louis Frederick (b. Hildburghausen, 11 September 1710 – d. Nimwegen, 10 June 1759), married on 4 May 1749 to Christine Luise von Holstein-Plön. This marriage was childless.
 Stillborn daughter (Hildburghausen, 2 August 1711).
 Stillborn daughter (Hildburghausen, 24 August 1712).
 Elisabeth Albertine (b. Hildburghausen, 3 August 1713 – d. Neustrelitz, 29 June 1761), married on 5 May 1735 to Duke Charles Louis Frederick of Mecklenburg, Herr of Mirow. They were the parents of Queen Charlotte of Mecklenburg-Strelitz, wife of king George III of the United Kingdom.
 Emanuel Frederick Charles (b. Hildburghausen, 26 March 1715 – d. Hildburghausen, 29 June 1718).
 Elisabeth Sophie (b. Hildburghausen, 13 September 1717 – d. Hildburghausen, 14 October 1717).
 Stillborn daughter (Hildburghausen, 17 March 1719).
 George Frederick William (b. Hildburghausen, 15 July 1720 – d. Hildburghausen, 10 April 1721).
 Stillborn son (Hildburghausen, 15 December 1721).

References 
 Heinrich Ferdinand Schoeppl: Die Herzoge von Sachsen-Altenburg, Bozen, 1917, reprinted Altenburg, 1992
 Dr. Rudolf Armin Human: Chronik der Stadt Hildburghausen, Hildburghausen, 1886

|-

House of Erbach
1683 births
1742 deaths
German countesses
18th-century women rulers